The Arikaree Formation, also Arikaree Group or Arikaree Sandstone is a geological unit in the central High Plains of the western United States. It preserves fossils dating to the late Oligocene to early Miocene.

See also

 List of fossiliferous stratigraphic units in North Dakota
 Paleontology in North Dakota

References

Neogene geology of South Dakota
Neogene Montana
Paleogene geology of North Dakota
Neogene geology of Wyoming